"The Joy of Living" is a song by British singers Cliff Richard and Hank Marvin released as a single in February 1970. It peaked at number 25 on the UK Singles Chart.

Release and reception
"The Joy of Living" was Richard's second single with Marvin, excluding their work with the Shadows, with the first, "Throw Down a Line", released the previous year. It was written by Marvin and Paul Ferris, the latter of whom had previously written "Visions" for Richard. It was released as a single with two B-sides. The first, "Leave My Woman Alone", written and originally recorded by Ray Charles, was sung only by Richard. The second, "Boogitoo", was written by Marvin and Richard Anthony Hewson and was sung only by Marvin.

The song has been described as "a cynical look at the modern age, where Britain is in danger of being turned into one huge motorway". Richard has said that "the "multicoloured crocodile" was the car, killing the trees and poisoning the air. I mean! It was kind of the first stages of the green movement, wasn’t it? I said [to Hank] I’d love to sing something like that. So we were trying to make a point".

Reviewing for Record Mirror, Peter Jones described "The Joy of Living" as "super-gentle, vocally, but not for long. Beautiful crisp Marvin guitar spasms, full chorus, and a sort of Gospel build-up. Do listen to the lyrics, which are thoughtfully strong. Actually, a darned good and repetitive pop record".

Track listing
7": Columbia / DB 8657
 "The Joy of Living" – 3:04
 "Leave My Woman Alone" – 2:57
 "Boogitoo" – 2:49

Charts

References

1970 songs
1970 singles
Cliff Richard songs
Hank Marvin songs
Songs written by Hank Marvin
Columbia Graphophone Company singles
Song recordings produced by Norrie Paramor
Songs written by Paul Ferris (composer)